Gallium(III) sulfide, Ga2S3, is a compound of sulfur and gallium, that is a semiconductor that has applications in electronics and photonics.

Structure
There are four polymorphs, α (hexagonal), α' (monoclinic), β(hexagonal) and γ(cubic). The alpha form is yellow. The crystal structures are related to those of ZnS with gallium in tetrahedral positions. The alpha and beta forms are isostructural with their aluminium analogues. The similarity in crystal form of gamma-   with sphalerite (zinc blende), ZnS is believed to explain the enrichment of gallium in sphalerite ores.

Preparation and chemical properties 
Ga2S3 can prepared by reacting the elements at high temperature or as a white solid  by heating Ga in a stream of H2S at high temperature (950 °C).

It may also prepared by a solid state reaction of GaCl3 and Na2S.

The method of production can determine the polymorphic form produced, the reaction of Ga(OH)3 with H2S at different temperatures is reported to produce a different polymorph depending on the temperature, α- 1020 K, β- 820 K and γ- above 873 K 

Ga2S3 decomposes at high temperature forming the non-stoichiometric sulfide, Ga4Sx (4.8 < x < 5.2).
Ga2S3 dissolves in aqueous acids and decomposes slowly in moist air forming H2S.

Ga2S3 dissolves in aqueous solutions of potassium sulfide, K2S to form K8Ga4S10 containing the (Ga4S10)8− anion which has an adamantane, molecular P4O10 structure.

Ternary sulfides MIGaS2, MIIGa2S4 and MIIIGaS3 respectively have been of interest due to their unusual electrical properties and some of these can be prepared by reactions of Ga2S3 with metal sulfides e.g. CdGa2S4:-
Ga2S3 + CdS → CdGa2S4

Although by itself Ga2S3 is not a glass former it can be reacted with rare earth sulfides to form glasses e.g. the reaction with lanthanum sulfide, La2S3, forms gallium lanthanum sulfide glass which has interesting optical properties and is a semiconductor.

References

Sulfides
Gallium compounds